Lê Văn Phước (born 15 October 1929) is a Vietnamese cyclist. He competed at the 1952 and 1956 Summer Olympics.

References

External links
 

1929 births
Possibly living people
Vietnamese male cyclists
Olympic cyclists of Vietnam
Cyclists at the 1952 Summer Olympics
Cyclists at the 1956 Summer Olympics